Anomala binotata is a species of shining leaf chafer in the family of scarab beetles, Scarabaeidae. The common name "Shining leaf chafer" is sometimes applied to this species specifically, but is more often used to describe all members of the subfamily Rutelinae.

Anomala binotata is found in North America, primarily east of the Rocky Mountains. It is considered a pest, with adults damaging grapes and other fruit crops. The grubs are minor pests of grain such as corn, wheat, and oats.

References

Rutelinae
Beetles described in 1817